Pszczółki may refer to the following places:
Pszczółki, Łódź Voivodeship (central Poland)
Pszczółki, Pomeranian Voivodeship (north Poland)
Pszczółki, Warmian-Masurian Voivodeship (north Poland)